Dentine Peak is, at , the highest peak in the northeast portion of the Molar Massif in the Bowers Mountains. It was named from association with Molar Massif by geologist R.A. Cooper, leader of the New Zealand Antarctic Research Programme paleontological parties to this area, 1974–75 and 1981–82. The peak lies situated on the Pennell Coast, a portion of Antarctica lying between Cape Williams and Cape Adare.

References

Mountains of Victoria Land
Pennell Coast